Gjallica or Gjallica e Lumës is a limestone mountain at  above sea level and the highest summit in the region of Kukës County, Albania.

The mountain falls within the Balkan mixed forests and Dinaric Mountains mixed forests terrestrial ecoregions of the Palearctic Temperate broadleaf and mixed forests biome. The slopes of the mountain is entirely covered with coniferous forests. It has thick vegetation of pines and beeches on high altitude, but sparse vegetation on the foot of the mountain due to the now closed plant that emitted harmful gases for the vegetation close to it.

See also 

 Geography of Albania
 Mountains of Albania

References 

 

Mountains of Albania
Geography of Kukës County
Two-thousanders of Albania